John of Burgundy may refer to:

 John of Burgundy (1231–1268), Count of Charolais and Lord of Bourbon
 John I of Viennois, member of the House of Burgundy, and Dauphin of Viennois
 John the Fearless, Duke of Burgundy, from 1404–1419
 John of Burgundy (bishop of Cambrai) (1404–1479), Archbishop of Trier